Membrane corticosteroid receptor include:

 Membrane glucocorticoid receptor
 Membrane mineralocorticoid receptor